Wolmar Schildt may refer to:

 Wolmar Onni Schildt, Finnish politician
 , Finnish doctor and translator, and linguist, developer of Finnish vocabulary